Georg Wilhelm Friedrich Hegel (1770–1831) was a German philosopher.

Hegel may also refer to:

People 
 Frederik Hegel (1817–1887), Danish bookseller
 Idora Hegel (born 1983), figure skater
 Karl von Hegel (1813–1901), German historian
 Rob Hegel (born 1948), American singer-songwriter
 Robert E. Hegel (born 1943), American sinologist

Other uses 
 Hegel (album), album by Italian singer-songwriter Lucio Battisti
 14845 Hegel, a minor planet
 Hegel Audio AS, audio equipment manufacturer
 Hegel Prize, a humanities award by the city of Stuttgart

See also
Hagel, a surname

German-language surnames
Surnames from given names